Domenico Pedrini (Bologna, 1728 - Bologna, 1800) was an Italian painter. Fiercely provincial in his geographic activity, Pedrini's works were mainly completed in and around Bologna, and yet his atavistic style strayed far afield into Bologna's strong Baroque ancestry.

Biography
He mainly painted for Bolognese churches including the church of San Bartolomeo (Madonna Addolorata), the Sanctuary of Santa Maria della Vita (St Joseph with the Christ Child), and the church of San Sigismondo (St Sigismund of Burgundy Adoring the Sacred Heart, main altarpiece). In the 1770s, he painted the altarpiece depicting Virgin and Child with St Cajetan for the church of Santa Maria delle Grazie alla Cavalleria in Bologna. Various quadrature and ornamental frescoes were completed in the Bolognese palaces of Cospi Ferretti, Fava-Simonetti and Tanari. Pedrini's allegorical ceiling paintings in the Palazzo Malvezzo, were likely to have been executed under the direction of Ubaldo Gandolfi. His son Filippo Pedrini was also a painter, who trained and worked with him. Felice Giani was one of his pupils.

At the Palazzo Spalletti-Trivelli in Reggio Emilia, there are three works by Pedrini, St Sebastian, Blessing of Jacob, and Expulsion of Hagar. There is a San Francesco di Sales e San Francesco di Paola at the Sanctuary of Santa Maria delle Grazie in Pavia.

His son, Filippo Pedrini, was also a painter and became a professor at the Accademia Clementina.

References
Renato Roli, Giuseppe Varotti e il Settecento Bolognese, Galleria de' Fusari

1728 births
1800 deaths
18th-century Italian painters
Italian male painters
19th-century Italian painters
Painters from Bologna
19th-century Italian male artists
18th-century Italian male artists